Iñaki Bergara Iríbar (born 26 January 1962) is a Spanish former footballer who played as a goalkeeper, currently goalkeeper coach of the Portugal national team.

Playing career
Born in Ondarroa, Biscay, Bergara began his career in his native Basque Country with Athletic Bilbao, and represented the Spain under-18 team in 1980. He made his professional debut with Deportivo Alavés, signing with Real Murcia in La Liga in 1986 and remaining in the top division the following nine seasons, but almost exclusively as a backup or third choice.

Bergara also played for Real Sociedad and CD Logroñés, appearing in 19 league matches during the 1994–95 campaign as the La Rioja side finished last with only 13 points and 79 goals conceded. He retired at the age of 33, due to a serious knee injury.

Coaching career
After retiring from football, Bergara began working as a goalkeepers' coach, first with Javier Clemente at the club where he began his career, Athletic Bilbao. In 2007, he joined his compatriot Roberto Martínez's backroom staff at Swansea City.

In summer 2009, as the manager left for the Premier League to sign for Wigan Athletic, Bergara joined him at the Latics. The pair moved to Everton in July 2013.

Bergara followed Martínez to Belgium in August 2016, where he became one of the two goalkeeping coaches alongside Erwin Lemmens. Six years later, both he and Ricardo moved with the manager to another national team, Portugal.

References

External links

1962 births
Living people
People from Ondarroa
Sportspeople from Biscay
Spanish footballers
Footballers from the Basque Country (autonomous community)
Association football goalkeepers
La Liga players
Segunda División B players
Bilbao Athletic footballers
Deportivo Alavés players
Real Murcia players
Real Sociedad footballers
CD Logroñés footballers
Spain youth international footballers
Spanish expatriate sportspeople in Wales
Spanish expatriate sportspeople in England
Spanish expatriate sportspeople in Belgium
Spanish expatriate sportspeople in Portugal
Athletic Bilbao non-playing staff
Swansea City A.F.C. non-playing staff
Wigan Athletic F.C. non-playing staff
Everton F.C. non-playing staff
Association football goalkeeping coaches